"iPad" is a song by American electronic music duo The Chainsmokers, released on March 11, 2022, via Disruptor Records and Columbia Records as the second single from the duo's fourth studio album So Far So Good (2022). The accompanying music video was released on the same day. Commercially, "iPad" debuted at number six on the Billboard Hot Dance/Electronic Songs chart, becoming the duo's twentieth top ten on the chart.

Background

Speaking on the song in an Instagram post the day prior to the song’s release, The Chainsmokers member Drew Taggart said:

Music video 
The official music video was released on the same day as the song, and was directed by Kid. Studio. In the video, Drew Taggart explores the local areas of New York City (Alex Pall and Matt McGuire make appearances around the video). The video represents the "conflicting emotions that follow ending an unhealthy relationship".

Charts

Weekly charts

Year-end charts

References

2022 songs
Songs written by Alex Pall
Songs written by Andrew Taggart
Songs written by Jacob Kasher
The Chainsmokers songs